Sarge is the nickname of:

 Paul Chambers (footballer) (born 1982), Australian rules footballer
 Norris Coleman (born 1961), American retired basketball player nicknamed "The Sarge"
 Sarge Ferris (1928-1989), American poker player
 Gary Matthews (born 1950), former Major League Baseball player and coach, and current Phillies broadcaster
 Brad McCrimmon (1959-2011), Canadian National Hockey League player and coach
 Orville Moody (1933-2008), American golfer
 Charles Rangel (born 1930), American politician, lawyer and Korean War soldier
 Mitchell Sargent (born 1979), Australian former rugby league footballer
 Lewis Sargentich, professor at Harvard Law School
 Tony Schumacher (drag racer) (born 1969), American drag racer

See also
 Gabby Street (1882-1951), American catcher, manager, coach, and radio broadcaster in Major League Baseball nicknamed "The Old Sarge"
 Hoyt Wilhelm (1922-2002), American Major League Baseball pitcher nicknamed "Ol' Sarge"
 Cap (nickname)

Lists of people by nickname